Darien Hinton, known professionally as Mooski, is an American rapper and singer. Signed to Capitol Records, he is best known for his 2021 viral single "Track Star", which peaked at number 31 on the Billboard Hot 100. It also gained popularity on TikTok. He released a remix of "Track Star" (featuring Chris Brown, A Boogie wit da Hoodie and Yung Bleu) on May 18, 2021. Hinton later released his debut studio album, Melodic Therapy 4 the Broken, on March 11, 2022.

Life and career 
Hinton was born and raised in Opp, Alabama and is of African-American descent. Both of his parents had health issues. Hinton grew up with an interest in music as part of the choir in a local church. He began his musical career as a Gospel rapper before switching to hip hop after he listened to Lil Wayne and Drake. Other hip hop artists that Hinton listened to include PnB Rock, Fetty Wap, and Kevin Gates.

After graduating high school in 2015, Hinton served in the United States Marine Corps for four years before he began working to establish his musical career.

In June 2020, Mooski released "Track Star" through TikTok where it gained rapid popularity, over 475+ million views. In February 2021, the song start streaming on other platforms and was released as a single by Capitol Records. "Track Star" later entered the Billboard Hot 100 at number 99 and peaked at number 31, remaining on the chart for a record-breaking 20 weeks. It also peaked at number 53 on the UK Singles Chart. A remix of the song (featuring A Boogie wit da Hoodie, Chris Brown and Yung Bleu) was released on May 18, 2021.

On March 11, 2022, Hinton released his debut studio album Melodic Therapy for the Broken. The album features guest appearances from Chris Brown, Yung Bleu, A Boogie wit da Hoodie, and K Camp. The song "Counting Time" samples "Charlene" by Anthony Hamilton.

Discography

Studio albums

Singles

As lead artist

Guest appearances

References

External links 

Year of birth missing (living people)
Living people
African-American male rappers
American hip hop singers
American contemporary R&B singers
Rappers from Alabama
Singers from Alabama
People from Opp, Alabama
Capitol Records artists
21st-century American rappers
21st-century American male musicians
21st-century African-American male singers
21st-century African-American musicians